William Hegney (11 January 1896 – 13 October 1982) was an Australian politician who was a Labor Party member of the Legislative Assembly of Western Australia from 1939 to 1968. He served as a minister in the government of Albert Hawke.

Hegney was born in Melbourne, as was his older brother James (also a future MP). The brothers came to Western Australia as children, where their father worked for Western Australian Government Railways. Hegney initially worked as a clerk with the Taxation Department, but later moved to the country, working as a shear and labourer. From 1920, he was the secretary and organiser of the Australian Workers' Union (AWU) in Northam, with responsibility for much of regional Western Australia. At the 1927 state election, Hegney ran against Sir James Mitchell, the Leader of the Opposition, losing by only a small margin. He was soon after elected to the state executive of the AWU, and eventually elected as a delegate from Western Australia to the AWU national executive council.

At the 1939 state election, Hegney was elected to the seat of Pilbara, defeating the sitting Nationalist member, Frank Welsh. At the 1947 election, he defeated an independent candidate, Leonard Taplin, by only a single vote, a result that was subsequently overturned by the Court of Disputed Returns. He went on to win the resulting by-election, keeping his seat. Hegney switched to the seat of Mount Hawthorn (located within the Perth metropolitan area) at the 1950 election. His old seat was won by Aloysius Rodoreda, the former member for Roebourne. After Labor's victory at the 1953 election, Hegney was made Minister for Native Welfare, Minister for Labour, and Minister for Prices in the Hawke government. After the 1956 election, his titles were Minister for Labour and Minister for Education, which he held until the defeat of the Labor government three years later. Hegney remained in parliament until his retirement at the 1968 election.

References

|-

|-

1896 births
1982 deaths
Australian Labor Party members of the Parliament of Western Australia
Australian trade unionists
Members of the Western Australian Legislative Assembly
Politicians from Melbourne
20th-century Australian politicians